Alexandre Hans (born 18 June 1994) is a Brazilian footballer who plays as a defender for Portuguese club Mafra on loan from Aves.

Career
In July 2016, Hans signed a two-year contract with Bulgarian side Pirin Blagoevgrad. He managed to make only six appearances and his contract was terminated by mutual consent in May 2017.

In June 2017, Hans signed with Portuguese club Aves and was loaned to LigaPro side Sporting da Covilhã.

References

External links

1994 births
Living people
Brazilian footballers
Brazilian expatriate footballers
Esporte Clube Internacional de Lages players
OFC Pirin Blagoevgrad players
C.D. Aves players
S.C. Covilhã players
Brazilian expatriate sportspeople in Bulgaria
Brazilian expatriate sportspeople in Portugal
Expatriate footballers in Bulgaria
Expatriate footballers in Portugal
First Professional Football League (Bulgaria) players
Liga Portugal 2 players
Association football defenders